Federico Tafani (born 12 December 1981) is an Italian footballer. He plays as a defender for Associazione Sportiva Dilettantistica Fabriano Cerreto.

External links
 LaSerieD.com profile 
 
  

1981 births
Living people
Sportspeople from the Province of Pesaro and Urbino
Italian footballers
A.C. Ancona players
A.S.D. Victor San Marino players
A.S. Gubbio 1910 players
Serie B players
Serie C players
Association football defenders
Footballers from Marche